MV Suquamish is an  that is operated by Washington State Ferries and the inaugural sailing was at 12:30pm on October 4, 2018. The vessel carries 144 cars and 1,500 passengers.

History

On March 16, 2016, the Washington State Transportation Commission chose to name the ferry Suquamish after the Suquamish tribe. Two other names, Cowlitz and Sammamish, were also considered for the ferry but ultimately rejected.

At the keel laying in May 2016, Suquamish tribe members blessed the boat and were joined by Governor Jay Inslee and Senator Christine Rolfes in a ceremonial weld strike. The ferry's superstructure was assembled in Tacoma, while the hull and car deck was built in Seattle. The superstructure was moved to Seattle for final assembly in August 2017 and completed sea trials in July 2018. The Suquamish was placed on the Mukilteo–Clinton route and entered service on October 4, 2018.

References

Washington State Ferries vessels
Ships built in Seattle